Wang Di may refer to:
 Wang Di (diplomat), Chinese diplomat
 Wang Di (referee), Chinese football referee
 Wang Di (wushu), Chinese wushu taolu athlete